Charles Richard Morris, Baron Morris of Grasmere,  (25 January 1898 – 30 May 1990) was an academic philosopher and Vice-Chancellor of the University of Leeds.

Morris was born in Sutton Valence, Kent, and educated at Tonbridge School and Trinity College, Oxford. From 1921 to 1943 he was fellow and tutor in philosophy at Balliol College, Oxford.  However, from 1939 during the Second World War he worked as a civil servant. He was appointed headmaster of King Edward's School, Birmingham, in 1941, taking up the post in 1943. He then became Vice-Chancellor of the University of Leeds from 1948 to 1963. In 1966 the University opened the Charles Morris Hall of Residence named after him. In 1955 he opened Netherhall School, Maryport, in Maryport, Cumbria.

Morris served as the chairman of both the Council for Training in Social Work and the Council for the Training of Health Visitors.

In 1967 he became a life peer as "Baron Morris of Grasmere, of Grasmere in the County of Westmorland".  He died at Grasmere in 1990 aged 92.

Family life 
Morris's wife, Mary, was the daughter of Ernest de Sélincourt: they had a son and a daughter, and wrote a book together, A History of Political Ideas.

Partial Bibliography 
 A History of Political Ideals (1924)
 Locke, Berkeley, Hume (1931)
 British Democracy (1939)
 Idealistic Logic : a study of its aim, method and achievement (1970)
 The Expanding University, a report (1962)
 The Idea of Adult Education (1963)
 The University in the American Future (1965); contributor
 A Time of Passion : America 1960-1980 (1984)

References

Morris of Grasmere, Charles Morris, Baron
Morris of Grasmere, Charles Morris, Baron
Morris of Grasmere, Charles Marris, Baron
Life peers created by Elizabeth II
Alumni of Trinity College, Oxford
Vice-Chancellors of the University of Leeds
Chief Masters of King Edward's School, Birmingham
Morris of Grasmere, Charles Marris, Baron
Fellows of Balliol College, Oxford
People educated at Tonbridge School
20th-century British philosophers
People from Grasmere (village)
People from Sutton Valence